Dragoș Ionuț Nedelcu (born 16 February 1997) is a Romanian professional footballer who plays as a defensive midfielder or a centre-back for Liga I club Farul Constanța.

Nedelcu started his senior career at Viitorul Constanța, for which he made his debut at age 17. He aided the side in winning its first national championship in the 2016–17 season, before being transferred to fellow league team FCSB.

Internationally, Nedelcu earned his first cap for Romania in November 2016, in a 0–1 loss to Russia. He represented the under-21 team at the 2019 UEFA European Championship, where they managed to progress to the semi-finals as group winners.

Club career

Viitorul Constanța
Nedelcu made his professional debut for Viitorul Constanța on 18 July 2014, in a 3–3 draw with Botoșani counting for the season's Cupa Ligii; Viitorul went further after a 5–3 penalty shoot-out win. His first appearance in the Liga I came ten days later, in a goalless draw at CSM Studențesc Iași.

FCSB
On 10 August 2017, Nedelcu signed a five-year contract with FCSB, one month after having initially refused to do so by arguing that he dreams of playing abroad. Him and his Viitorul teammate Romario Benzar were acquired by the Bucharest-based club for a combined cost of €2.7 million, and an additional €500,000 fee was paid for Nedelcu in November to remove an interest clause in his deal. Nedelcu made his debut for the Roș-albaștrii in a 1–1 league draw with Astra Giurgiu, on 12 August 2017. On 5 November, he scored his first goal in a 2–1 victory over Concordia Chiajna.

Nedelcu often struggled with injuries during his stint in the capital, and on 12 June 2021 was sent out on a one-year loan with a purchase option to 2. Bundesliga club Fortuna Düsseldorf. On 4 February 2022, after his initial loan at Fortuna was cancelled prematurely, he moved to boyhood club Viitorul—now renamed Farul Constanța—on loan for the remainder of the campaign.

International career
In November 2016, Nedelcu received his first call-up to the Romania senior team for the matches against Poland and Russia, making his debut in a 0–1 friendly loss to the latter.

Career statistics

Club

International

Honours
Viitorul Constanța
Liga I: 2016–17
Supercupa României runner-up: 2017

FCSB
Cupa României: 2019–20
Supercupa României runner-up: 2020

References

External links

1997 births
Living people
Sportspeople from Constanța
Romanian footballers
Association football defenders
Association football midfielders
Liga I players
FC Viitorul Constanța players
FC Steaua București players
2. Bundesliga players
Fortuna Düsseldorf players
FCV Farul Constanța players
Romania youth international footballers
Romania under-21 international footballers
Romania international footballers
Olympic footballers of Romania
Romanian expatriate footballers
Expatriate footballers in Germany
Romanian expatriate sportspeople in Germany